In Islam, Simon Peter, known in Arabic as Shamoun as-Safa or Shamoun ibn Hammoun, was one of the original disciples of Jesus according to Muslim tradition and exegesis. Although Jesus's disciples have not played a major role in Islamic theology, they are notable in that they are the only group of disciples specifically identified in the Quran. Peter's figure is important as he is generally regarded as the successor of Jesus who led the faithful after the crucifixion, and therefore is similar to the Christian (specifically Roman Catholic) view of Peter as the 'Prince of the Apostles'.

The Qur'an is clear that the disciples of Jesus were steadfast believers in Allah. The Qur'an records that when Jesus began to feel the rejection of the Israelites, he asked the people as to who among them will be his supporters in preaching the Gospel. It was then that the disciples stood up and asked Jesus to bear witness that they had submitted to God and further promised to stay by Jesus during his whole life. The Qur'an further records that God inspired the disciples to believe in His message and messenger. It further recounts a feast from Heaven, which was a sign for the disciples of Jesus. Although the Qur’an does not name nor number the disciples, Qur'anic exegesis names the disciples, with Peter usually listed at the head of all lists, corresponding with his role as head of the disciples.

Numerous incidents involving Peter are narrated in Muslim tradition and tafsir. The most famous of these is the narrative of Peter's preaching in Antioch, which is closely linked with the legend of Habib the Carpenter. Muslim tradition narrates that two of Jesus's disciples, John and Jude, went to preach the Gospel in Antioch, as its people were devoted to idols. Few people, however, followed their message, despite the two disciples having performed various miracles including healing the sick and the blind. The disciples healed Habib's son and Habib helped preach the Gospel to the people. When the news of the disciples reached the governor of the city, he called to see John and Jude. As the governor did not agree with the message of God, he threw John and Jude into prison. While the two were in prison, Peter went to Antioch. Peter was allowed to perform a miracle in front of the governor, where he raised a child who had been dead for seven days. The people refused to believe Peter's words, and angry with Habib for his faith, they stoned him to death. Non-Muslim sources maintain that Peter later went to Rome to preach the Gospel.

Peter is important in branches of Shia Islam as well as Isma'ilism, as his role is seen as the direct parallel to that of 'Ali as the first Imām after a Prophet. Shi'i Muslims maintain that every major Prophet had a Disciple or Waṣî (وصي) (Executor-of-Will) who became the Imām (Leader) after his death: Adam had his son, Seth; Noah had Shem; Abraham had his sons; Moses had Joshua; and Jesus had Peter.

Believed descendants
For information about Narjis, her mother, and her reported son (the twelfth Imam of Twelver Shi’ism), see the articles Narjis and Muhammad al-Mahdi.

See also
 People of Ya-Sin

References

Islam
New Testament people in Islam